John Benn Walsh, 1st Baron Ormathwaite (9 December 1798 – 3 April 1881), known as Sir John Walsh, Bt, between 1825 and 1868, was a British Tory and Conservative Party politician.

Early life
He was born at Warfield Park, near Bracknell in Berkshire, the only son of Sir John Walsh, 1st Baronet, and Margaret Benn. His mother and father were named Benn but had assumed the surname of Walsh in lieu of his patronymic in 1795, in accordance with the will of his wife's uncle Sir John Walsh (1726–1795), who left him a fortune made in India, including estates in Berkshire and Radnorshire, and also large holdings in Ireland, mainly in Cork and Kerry. Under the terms of the will, the Walsh fortune was to be managed by his parents until he came of age.

He was educated at Eton and Christ Church, Oxford, matriculating in 1816. He inherited the Radnorshire from his mother on attaining his majority in 1819 and also inherited his father's Cumbria estates on his death in 1825. By 1874 his total acreage in Radnorshire had reached 12,500. He also visited his Irish estates regularly over 40 years, and made great efforts to increase the profits. He had the reputation in Ireland of being a harsh and exacting landlord, but his diary shows that he saw himself as a benevolent overseer of his tenants, whom he rewarded for hard work, while ruthlessly evicting those who would not work.

Political career
He served as High Sheriff of Berkshire and High Sheriff of Radnorshire for 1823. He then sat as Member of Parliament (MP) for Sudbury between 1830 and 1835 and 1838 and 1840 and for Radnorshire between 1840 and 1868. He also served as Lord Lieutenant and Custos Rotulorum of Radnorshire from 1842 to 1875. In 1868 he was raised to the peerage as Baron Ormathwaite, of Ormathwaite in the County of Cumberland.

He issued numerous pamphlets, amongst which were: 
 The Poor Laws in Ireland (1830)
 Observations on the Ministerial Plan of Reform (1831)
 On the Present Balance of Parties in the State (1832)
 Chapters of Contemporary History (1836)
 Political Back-Games (1871)
 Astronomy and Geology Compared (1872)
 Lessons of the French Revolution, 1789-1872 (1873).

Family
Lord Ormathwaite married Jane, daughter of George Grey, 6th Earl of Stamford, in 1825. They had two sons and two daughters. He died at Warfield in April 1881, aged 82, and was succeeded in his titles by his eldest son, Arthur.

Arms

References

Information on the Walsh family

External links 
 

1798 births
1881 deaths
People from Warfield
People educated at Eton College
Alumni of Christ Church, Oxford
Barons in the Peerage of the United Kingdom
Walsh, John
Lord-Lieutenants of Radnorshire
High Sheriffs of Berkshire
High Sheriffs of Radnorshire
Deputy Lieutenants of Berkshire
Walsh, John
Walsh, John
Walsh, John
Walsh, John
Walsh, John
Walsh, John
Walsh, John
Walsh, John
Walsh, John
Walsh, John
Walsh, John
UK MPs who were granted peerages
Tory MPs (pre-1834)
Peers of the United Kingdom created by Queen Victoria